Thomas White (1628–1698) was Bishop of Peterborough from 1685 to 1690.

Life
He was educated at St John's College, Cambridge.

White held the following livings:
 Vicar of the Church of St. Mary Magdalene, Newark-on-Trent, 1660–66.
 Rector of All-Hallows-the-Great, London, 1666–79.
 Rector of St Mary the Virgin's Church, Bottesford, 1679–85.
 Archdeacon of Nottingham, 1683–85.

In 1683 White became chaplain to Princess Anne. He was appointed Bishop of Peterborough in 1685.

He was one of the seven bishops who petitioned against the declaration of Indulgence issued by James II in 1688, and with the others was tried and sensationally acquitted. Although the trial had contributed to the Glorious Revolution, he was one of the non-juring bishops, refusing to take the oath of allegiance to William III and Mary II in 1689 and so was deprived of his see in February 1690. He died eight years later.

References

Attribution

Bishops of Peterborough
British nonjuror bishops
1628 births
1698 deaths
17th-century Church of England bishops
Archdeacons of Nottingham
Alumni of St John's College, Cambridge